The Mahoning Valley Scrappers are a collegiate summer baseball team of the MLB Draft League. They are located in Niles, Ohio, a city in the valley of the Mahoning River, and play their home games at Eastwood Field. From 1999 to 2020, they were a Minor League Baseball team that played as members of the New York–Penn League. The club was the Class A Short Season affiliate of the Cleveland Guardians from its inception until Major League Baseball's reorganization of the minors following the 2020 season.

In 2004, the Scrappers won the New York–Penn League championship.

Season by season results

Regular season

Post-season
1999: Defeated Batavia Muckdogs, 2 games to 0; lost to Hudson Valley Renegades, 2 games to 1, in NYPL Championship Series
2000: Defeated Batavia Muckdogs, 2 games to 0; lost to Staten Island Yankees, 2 games to 1, in NYPL Championship Series
2004: Defeated Auburn Doubledays, 2 games to 0; defeated Tri-City ValleyCats, 2 games to 0, in NYPL Championship Series
2009: Defeated Brooklyn Cyclones, 2 games to 0; lost to Staten Island Yankees, 2 games to 1 in NYPL Championship Series
2017: Lost to Vermont Lake Monsters, 2 games to 0
2018: Lost to Tri-City ValleyCats, 2 games to 0

Roster

Broadcasters and radio
As of the 2015 season, the Scrappers' flagship radio station is Youngstown, Ohio station WBBW (Sportsradio 1240 AM). All of the games will be carried live.

Austin Pollack was named the play-by-play broadcaster in January 2015. Pollack will broadcast all 76 games for the Scrappers.
Warren, Ohio station WHKZ (1440 AM The Word) broadcast Scrappers games in 2013.

Warren, Ohio station WHTX (1570 AM) broadcast Scrappers games from 2010 to 2012.

Youngstown, Ohio station WNIO (1390 AM) broadcast Scrappers games from 2002 to 2009.

Former Channel 27 news anchor Robb Schmidt, is the current P.A. announcer. Schmidt took over the position from John Brown, who was a communications student at Youngstown State University and served as announcer in 2009 and 2010. Brown replaced current Cleveland Indians announcer Ryan Pritt.

Mike Pilch called their games in 2006 and 2007 while the broadcasts right were with Clear Channel.

Youngstown, Ohio station WBBW (1240 AM) originally broadcast Scrappers games from 1999 to 2001 with John Batcho calling the games.

Scrappers games from 2021-2022 have been broadcast by Your Sports Network (YSN) digitally on YSNLive.com.  Ron Potesta covered play by play duties in 2021 before Richie Juliano assumed the responsibilities of the “Voice of the Scrappers” in 2022.

Alumni

References

External links
 
 Statistics from Baseball-Reference

1999 establishments in Ohio
Baseball teams established in 1999
Cleveland Guardians minor league affiliates
New York–Penn League teams
MLB Draft League teams
Niles, Ohio
Professional baseball teams in Ohio